The Best Of Dave Mason is a 1981 album by Dave Mason and was released on LP and cassette on the Columbia Records label.  It was released on compact disc in 1986 and remastered for a 2010 CD in Japan. Allmusic's retrospective review criticized the album as it "did not live up to its name entirely".  The reason for this is the selection of songs present on the record, as well as it not being comprehensive enough.

Track listing

References

Dave Mason albums
1981 greatest hits albums